Nathan Arthur Byham (born June 27, 1988) is an American football coach and former tight end, who is the current tight ends coach for the Stanford Cardinal. He played collegiate football at the University of Pittsburgh. Byham was regarded as one of the best blocking tight end prospects for the 2010 NFL Draft. He was drafted by the San Francisco 49ers in the sixth round.

Professional career

2010 NFL Draft
Byham was selected by the San Francisco 49ers in the sixth round of the 2010 NFL Draft with the 182nd overall pick.

References

External links
San Francisco 49ers bio 
Pittsburgh Panthers bio 
Tampa Bay Buccaneers bio 

1988 births
Living people
American football tight ends
Players of American football from Pennsylvania
Albany Great Danes football coaches
Pittsburgh Panthers football players
San Francisco 49ers players
Tampa Bay Buccaneers players
New England Patriots players
People from Franklin, Pennsylvania
Stanford Cardinal football coaches